Gazoryctra roseicaput is a moth of the family Hepialidae. It was described by Berthold Neumoegen and Harrison Gray Dyar Jr. in 1893. It is known from the mountains of western North America, including Washington, Oregon, British Columbia and Alberta.

The wingspan is about 32 mm. Adults are dull red brown with silvery-white spots on the forewings. The hindwings are unmarked. Adults are on wing in the last half of August.

References

Moths described in 1893
Hepialidae
Moths of North America